The Conscious Mind: In Search of a Fundamental Theory was published in 1996, and is the first book written by David Chalmers, an Australian philosopher specialising in philosophy of mind. Although the book has been greatly influential, Chalmers maintains that it is "far from perfect", as most of it was written as part of his PhD dissertation after "studying philosophy for only four years".

Summary

Thesis
In The Conscious Mind Chalmers argues that (1) the physical does not exhaust the actual, so materialism is false; (2) consciousness is a fundamental fact of nature; (3) science and philosophy should strive towards discovering a fundamental law of consciousness.

Definitions
psychological consciousness: publicly accessible descriptions of consciousness, such as its neurochemical correlates or role in influencing behaviour.
phenomenal consciousness: experience; something is phenomenologically conscious if it feels like something to be it.
Every mental state can be described in psychological terms, phenomenological terms, or both.

Further clarification
Psychological and phenomenal consciousness are often conflated. Thinkers may purport to have solved consciousness (in the phenomenological sense) when really all they have solved are certain aspects of psychological consciousness. To use Chalmers words: they claim to have solved the "hard problem of consciousness", when really all they have solved are certain "easy problems of consciousness".
Chalmers believes that an adequate theory of consciousness can only come by solving both the hard and easy problems. On top of discovering brain states associated with conscious experience, science must also discover why and how certain brain states are accompanied by experience. This is what Chalmers attempts to do in The Conscious Mind.

Arguments against reductionism
The hard problem is hard, by Chalmers account, because conscious experience is irreducible to lower order physical facts. He supports this conclusion with three main lines of argument, which are summarised below.

Appeals to Conceivability: Chalmers argues that conscious experience can always be "abstracted away" from reductive explanations. This is evidenced by the conceivability and, by extension, logical possibility of philosophical zombies (exact replicas of a person that lack conscious experience). Alternatively, it is conceivable that a "partial zombie" could have been "physically identical", but not "phenomenological identical" to their nonzombie twin (they could have an inverted visible spectrum, for instance).
Appeals to Epistemology: Unlike other forms of knowledge, knowledge of consciousness can only ever be gained through first hand experience. The problem of other minds is evidence of this. Frank Jackson's famous thought experiment Mary's Room demonstrates a similar point. Upon seeing red, Mary gains new information was not entailed by the physical facts alone. 
Appeals to Analysis: There are no satisfying reductive accounts of consciousness, and it is not even clear what such a theory would look like. All such accounts suffer from the same core sin: the inability to explain why certain brain states are accompanied by conscious experience.
The conclusion of all these arguments is the same: consciousness is irreducible to physical facts alone.

Against materialism
The only things that are irreducible to lower level facts are fundamental laws of nature (e.g., space and time). Since consciousness is irreducible, Chalmers believes that it, too, is fundamental.

Chalmers accepts that people may be reluctant to accept this conclusion, but notes that people were initially reluctant to accept the fundamental nature of electromagnetism as well. He also accepts that his conclusion sound jarring, but notes that the brute nature of consciousness poses no more a mystery than the brute nature of electromagnetism, gravity, or any other fundamental law.

Constraints
So, just as scientists of the past have sought fundamental laws of gravity and electromagnetism, so too should scientists of the present seek fundamental laws of consciousness. So, after providing the disclaimer that he is "most likely to be entirely wrong", Chalmers puts forward possible ways in which the search for a theory may be constrained:
 Phenomenal Judgements: A theory of consciousness should be able to dispel epiphenominalism without resorting to interactionism (a view which Chalmers rejects).
 The Double-Aspect Principle: Some information must be realised both physically and phenomenologically (i.e., realised both in the mind and brain). 
 Structural Coherence: the internal structure of consciousness (structural relations between qualia, such as the red/green blue/yellow axis of colour vision) must be accounted for.
 The Principle of Organisational Invariance: Through the thought experiments of Fading Qualia and Dancing Qualia.[see: Further reading] Chalmers concludes that consciousness and its contents are substrate independent; structurally isomorphic computations must create qualitatively identical experiences regardless of how they are realised.
Similarly, Chalmers puts forward a number of "open questions" that a fundamental theory must answer:
 Why does certain information correspond to certain qualia rather than functionally equivalent qualia?
 What are the relations between spatial representations in the mind and the structure of space itself?
 How do the structures of our sensory and neurological apparatus influence the structure of consciousness?
 What causes the unification of consciousness?
 Why are some bits of information realised in experience while others are not.
Good contenders for a fundamental theory of consciousness would be one that (a) fits the above criteria; (b) is compatible with the data; (c) has predicative power; and (c) is elegant. Though, of course, there will likely be further considerations that arise as science progresses.

Speculation
Chalmers explores a number of possibilities. Chalmers believes that information will invariably play a central role in any theory of consciousness. However, Chalmers is unsure whether or not information will ultimately play a conceptual role or an ontological one. Chalmers further constraints the role of information by concluding that it must only be phenomenally realised it is physically realised; in other words, the information system must be active (otherwise a computer that's turned off may qualia). So causation may also play a role.

Interestingly, this account of consciousness has predictive power within the realm of quantum theory. Namely, it addresses objections made by the physicist Roger Penrose regarding the many worlds interpretation of quantum mechanics:I do not see why a conscious being need be aware of only "one" of the alternatives in a linear superposition. What is it about consciousnesses that says that consciousness must not be "aware" of that tantalising linear combination of both a dead and a live cat? It seems to me that a theory of consciousness would be needed for one to square the many world view with what one actually observes.Chalmers' earlier account of consciousness is such a theory. This leaves the many-world view undoubtedly the most elegant of all interpretations of quantum mechanics (from a mathematical standpoint), albeit a counterintuitive one.

Reception

The Conscious Mind has had significant influence on philosophy of mind and the scientific study of consciousness, as is evidenced by Chalmers easy/hard problem distinction having become standard terminology within relevant philosophical and scientific fields. Chalmers has expressed bewilderment at the book's success, writing that it has "received far more attention than I reasonably could have expected."

Praise 
David Lewis is a proponent of materialism whose views are criticised numerous times throughout The Conscious Mind. Despite this, Lewis praises Chalmers for his understanding of the issue and for leaving his critics with "few points to make" that Chalmers "hasn't made already". Lewis has characterised The Conscious Mind as "exceptionally ambitious and exceptionally successful", considering it "the best book in philosophy of mind for many years."

Steven Pinker has hailed The Conscious Mind as an "outstanding contribution" to consciousness studies, stating that Chalmers argued his thesis "with impeccable clarity and rigor".

Criticism 
Patricia and Paul Churchland have criticised Chalmers claim that everything but consciousness logically supervenes on the physical, and that such failures of supervenience mean that materialism must be false. Heat and luminescence, for instance, are both physical properties that logically supervene on the physical. Others have questioned the premise that a priori entailment is required for logical supervenience.

Daniel Dennett has labelled Chalmers a "reactionary", and calls the invocation of philosophical zombies "an embarrassment". By his account, the thought experiment hinges on a "hunch" and begs the question. He argues that the mysterious nature of consciousness amounts to nothing more than a cognitive illusion, and that philosophers ought to drop "the zombie like a hot potato".

Chalmers responds to critics in his 2010 book The Character of Consciousness and on his website.

Book reviews 
The Conscious Mind has been reviewed in journals such as  Foundations of Physics, Psychological Medicine, Mind, The Journal of Mind and Behavior, and Australian Review of Books. The book was described by The Sunday Times as "one of the best science books of the year."

See also

 Philosophy of Mind
 The Mind-Body Problem
 Explanatory gap
 Problem of other minds
 Brain in a vat
 What is it Like to be a Bat?
 Qualia
 Supervenience
 Philosophical Zombie
 Neutral monism
 Chinese Room
 Meditations on First Philosophy
 Consciousness Explained

Notes

References

Citations

Sources

Further reading
 Papers on Consciousness David Chalmers
 Absent Qualia, Fading Qualia, and Dancing Qualia David Chalmers
 What is it Like to be a bat? Thomas Nagel
 Consciousness (Stanford Encyclopedia of Philosophy)
 Two-Dimensional Semantics (Stanford Encyclopedia of Philosophy)

1996 non-fiction books
Books by David Chalmers
English-language books
Oxford University Press books
Philosophy books
Metaphysics of mind
Philosophy of mind